Eurypyle (Ancient Greek: Εὐρυπύλη) was a queen of the Amazons who was reported to have led an expedition against Ninun and Babylon.

Notes

Queens of the Amazons